Robert Nigel Gildea (born 12 September 1952) is professor of Modern History at the University of Oxford and is the author of several influential books on 20th century French history.

Biography 
Robert Gildea was born on 12 September 1952. He was educated at Dulwich College and at Merton College, Oxford, before attending St Antony's for a D.Phil under the supervision of Theodore Zeldin. His D.Phil. research was in French provincial education. Before being appointed Fellow in Modern History at Merton in 1979, he was a lecturer at King's College, London.

For his 2002 book Marianne in Chains, a study of life in provincial France during the German occupation, Gildea won the prestigious Wolfson History Prize. The book, however, outraged members of the French academic elite through its documented claims that life in France had not been as adversely affected by the Nazi occupation because many French people had co-operated with the German invaders – far more so than previously believed.

He was elevated to the position of Professor of Modern History from being Professor of Modern French History in September 2006, and is currently a Fellow of Worcester College. On 10 June 2021 in a BBC Radio 4 interview he declared he was joining other concerned academics in boycotting Oriel College for its refusal to remove the statue of Cecil Rhodes from the façade of the building, erected using money donated by Rhodes. 

Gildea lives in Oxford with his wife, Lucy-Jean, and four children.

Bibliography 

 
 
 
 
 « La génération française de 1968 : points de vue personnel et politique ». L’Amuse-Bouche : La revue française de Yale. The French-Language Journal at Yale University. 1/1 (2010): 39-48.
  Review essay.
 
 Empires of the Mind: The Colonial Past and the Politics of the Present. Oxford University Press (2019).

See also 
 Roger Highfield
 Philip Waller

References

External links 
 University of Oxford: Robert Gildea
 Robert Gildea on WW2 at YouTube Retrieved 3 August 2020

1952 births
Living people
Academics of King's College London
Alumni of Merton College, Oxford
Alumni of St Antony's College, Oxford
English historians
Fellows of Merton College, Oxford
Fellows of Worcester College, Oxford
Historians of Vichy France
History Today people
People educated at Dulwich College